Misumi USA is a subsidiary of Misumi Corporation, established in February 1988. Misumi USA is known for providing fixed and configurable components for the manufacturing industry, and is headquartered in Schaumburg, Illinois.

History
Misumi Corporation was founded in 1963 under the name Misumi Shoji Co., Ltd. In the early years of its founding, the company focused primarily on the sale of electronic equipment and bearings, as well as press die components.

Throughout its first 25 years, Misumi Corp continued to establish regional presences across Japan. In order to better-serve the American market, Misumi Corp established a subsidiary, Misumi USA, in February 1988.

MISUMI Group Inc 
Established in 1963, MISUMI Group Inc. is the world's largest supplier of fixed and configurable components for the manufacturing industry. It divides global operations in to Europe, Asia, Japan, and North America.

Current business model
As of February 2014, Misumi USA supplies over 20.7 million different configurable components for assembly automation in the automotive, appliance, semi-conductor, medical, and packaging industries, with over 30,000 products available for same-day shipping. Misumi promotes that it bears no minimum order requirements or set-up charges, allowing greater flexibility in ordering for small companies and individuals.
Misumi USA is known for its QCT (Quality, Cost, Time) model, fulfilled by catalog sales of standardized products, along with piece-by-piece production of customizable products.
Misumi has operated under the leadership of Co-CEOs, Tadashi Saegusa and Masayuki Takaya, since June 2002. Beginning that year, the new management implemented a series of reforms including the following:

Discontinuing Diversified Business Model: Misumi chose to return to its core business of precision mechanical industrial components for die-and-mold and factory-automation applications only, and cut ties with all subsidiaries that did not align closely to this core practice.
Expanding Overseas: To extend the QCT model abroad, Misumi began building out infrastructure including sales offices, logistics centers, and manufacturing sites in each new market entered.
Acquiring SURUGA SEIKI: In acquiring this development and manufacturing company, Misumi brought manufacturing in-house.
Delegating Authority Across the Organization: In 2007, Misumi brought the concept of “small is beautiful” to its operating companies, organizing its business into small autonomous teams responsible for sales, product development, and manufacturing.

Currently, Misumi is aggressively pursuing sales and operating income records year over year, in conjunction with continued global expansion and partnerships across industry verticals.
Misumi USA consists of a local suppliers network including Sugura USA in Addison, Illinois, along with its own distribution centers near Chicago O’Hare Airport and in Torrance, California.

In November 2012, Misumi acquired the Dayton Lamina Corporation, a company known for press die components, with brands including Dayton Progress, Lamina, Danly, IEM, and Lempco. Beginning August 2015, Dayton Lamina began the manufacture of Misumi Brand die components in Ohio.

In November 2017, Misumi announced plans to expand manufacturing and distribution in North America through the creation of a subsidiary in Querétaro City, Querétaro, Mexico. Misumi Mexico will be operational beginning April 2018.

As of November 2017, Misumi currently operates 24 Manufacturing facilities, 14 Distribution Centers, and 62 Sales Offices around the globe.

Environmental and social contributions
Misumi's products are compliant with the European Union’s RoHS Directive, restricting the use of hazardous substances. As innovations in green production, Misumi has developed equipment cables with superior oil and heat resistance, as well as combined terminal blocks and components. As part of a green procurement initiative, Misumi  also mandates that its suppliers comply with a strict set of guidelines, including a chemical substances survey and report. In January 2014, MISUMI embarked on an initiative to enhance workplace safety by introducing a new nitrogen gas spring to the North American market.

Misumi offers a University Partnership program which provides discounts and sponsorships to students in the United States and Canada for senior design and competition projects. This program began in 2012 and is currently active in over 50 colleges and universities.

Beginning in 2016, Misumi became a Silver Level Supplier for FIRST Robotics, an international high school robotics competition.

See also 

 MSC Industrial Direct
 Grainger
 McMaster-Carr

References

External links
 http://www.misumi.co.jp/english/company/history/index.html

Companies based in Cook County, Illinois
Schaumburg, Illinois
Industrial supply companies
American subsidiaries of foreign companies